is a fighting/wrestling game released on May 5, 1992 by SNK. It is a sequel to the 1991 game King of the Monsters. In this game three of the previous game's surviving monsters return and battle across the Globe against giant alien monsters that threaten the Earth. The game was later ported to  the Super NES and Sega Genesis by Takara.

Plot
3 years after the events of the first game, only three monsters have survived what is known in history books as the KING OF THE MONSTERS massacre. They have become more advanced and dangerous than ever before. But now in 1999, a powerful alien monster and his wave of minions threaten to conquer the Earth. The surviving monsters must defeat the alien menace and once again prove who is the King of the Monsters.

Gameplay

Players choose one of 3 monsters for battle, and two players can join forces to fight the monsters together. Unlike the previous game this game features side scrolling levels in areas around the world which ends in a boss battle. During the boss battle the same kind of button mashing that was featured in the first game to win grapples returns.
The game consists of 7 total levels which take place in areas around the World. The game begins in American City followed by French City, Grand Canyon, Desert, Sea Bed, Lava Zone and ends in Enemy Hideout. After the player(s) clear the first 6 levels, they then enter the final stage where they must fight all the bosses again before encountering the final boss of the game. After the final boss is defeated the player(s) must destroy his small remnants within a time limit. If the player(s) fail to do so,  the game has a "bad ending", but if the remnants are destroyed within the time limit the player(s) receive the "good ending".
Outside of the levels the game features 2 bonus stages as well as a ranking at the end of the level according to how well the player(s) performed correlating with the number of points the player(s) receive as the end level bonus. These rankings and points are "Good" (1000), "Very Good" (3000), "Nice Going" (5000), "That's Strong" (8000), "Congratulations" (10,000), "Ahhhh" (20,000), "Great" (30,000), "Miraculous" (40,000), "Great Player" (50,000), and "Mystery Zone!!" (100,000).

Characters

Playable Monsters
Three of the previous game's monsters return with modified bodies, powers, and names.	 
Super Geon:  Geon returns from the first game, now mutated and appearing more dragon-like.
Cyber Woo:  Woo returns from the first game now refurbished into a cyborg resembling Mechani-Kong.
Atomic Guy:  Astro Guy returns from the first game now more powered up and with a new costume.

Bosses
The boss monsters had different names in the Japanese and American/European ports of the game:
Huge Keal (Japanese) or Huge Frogger (American/European):  The Stage 1 boss. A huge humanoid frog monster wearing a helmet.
Horn du Out (Japanese) or Eifflelyte (American/European):  The Stage 2 boss. A giant in a loincloth with a parasitic blob attached to his head.
Yam a Mordon (Japanese) or Clawhead (American/European): The Stage 3 boss. A two-headed backward walking monster.
Kili-Kili (Japanese) or Beetle Master (American/European):  The Stage 4 boss. A giant insectoid monster with a domed brain for a head.
Sack Eyes (Japanese) or Aqua Slug (American/European):  The Stage 5 boss. A giant aquatic snail monster in a spiked shell.
Eat Wow (Japanese) or Lavicus (American/European):  The Stage 6 boss. A giant gremlin-like creature with an oversized mouth and nozzle-like appendage on its head with which it lays eggs that hatch into minion monsters.
King Famardy (Japanese) or Famardy (American/European):  The final boss. A massive blob monster with multiple eyes and a fetus-like organism for a tongue.

Ports
The game was released for the Neo Geo AES on June 1, 1992 and was ported to the Neo Geo CD (in Japan only) on September 9, 1994 (as a launch title). 
The game was ported to the SNES on December 22, 1993, and Sega Genesis exclusively in North America on 1994 by Takara. The  Genesis version was developed by Betop and differs significantly from the original version of the game. Rather than being a side-scrolling beat 'em up, this version plays like a one on one fighting game. This version also gives the player the ability to play as the various boss monsters. All characters (excluding Famardy) are playable and have all been given special attacks executed using standard fighting game motions. Players must destroy all other monsters, one after the other, without any of the scrolling stages in the Neo-Geo version and then defeat a clone of the player's monster to win the game. This version of the game also takes place in 3 extra cities in Kyoto City, Tokyo City, and Osaka City.

Reception 

In Japan, Game Machine listed King of the Monsters 2 on their July 1, 1992 issue as being the eleventh most-successful table arcade unit of the month. RePlay also reported the game to be the eleventh most-popular arcade game at the time.

Other appearances
In 2005, Cyber Woo, Super Geon, and Atomic Guy were featured in the SNK Playmore game NeoGeo Battle Coliseum, a fighting game featuring many of the company's popular characters. These characters also appeared as character cards in the DS game SNK vs Capcom: Card Fighters DS. 
In 2018, the game was ported to the Nintendo Switch Shop by Hamster as part of their Arcade Archives line. The port features two extra features in a High Score Mode and Caravan Mode.

Notes

References

External links 
 King of the Monsters 2 at GameFAQs
 King of the Monsters 2 at Giant Bomb
 King of the Monsters 2 at Killer List of Videogames
 King of the Monsters 2 at MobyGames

1992 video games
ACA Neo Geo games
Arcade video games
Cooperative video games
D4 Enterprise games
Dinosaurs in video games
Fighting games
Kaiju video games
Multiplayer and single-player video games
Neo Geo games
Neo Geo CD games
Nintendo Switch games
Now Production games
PlayStation Network games
PlayStation 4 games
Sega Genesis games
Side-scrolling beat 'em ups
SNK games
SNK beat 'em ups
Super Nintendo Entertainment System games
Takara video games
Video games set in 1999
Video games with oblique graphics
Virtual Console games
Windows games
Xbox One games
Video games developed in Japan
Hamster Corporation games